James Gibb (30 June 1843 – 22 February 1919) was an Australian politician. Born in Campbellfield, Victoria, he was educated at Scotch College before becoming a farmer at Berwick. He was active in local politics as a member of Berwick Shire Council. In 1880, he was elected to the Victorian Legislative Assembly as the member for Mornington, and remained in the Assembly until 1886. In 1903, he was elected to the Australian House of Representatives as the Free Trade Party member for Flinders. He held the seat until 1906, when he unsuccessfully attempted to transfer to the New South Wales seat of Hume in the hope of defeating the former Protectionist Premier of New South Wales, Sir William Lyne. Gibb died in 1919.

References

Free Trade Party members of the Parliament of Australia
Members of the Australian House of Representatives for Flinders
Members of the Australian House of Representatives
1843 births
1919 deaths
People educated at Scotch College, Melbourne
20th-century Australian politicians
People from Campbellfield, Victoria
Australian farmers
Politicians from Melbourne